Loco Mountain is the name of the following peaks in the United States:

 Loco Mountain (Fremont County, Colorado), Fremont County, Colorado
 Loco Mountain (Meagher County, Montana)